Nicholson Rock is a rock 2.5 nautical miles (4.6 km) east of Cox Bluff on the mainly snow-covered Spitz Ridge in eastern Toney Mountain massif, Marie Byrd Land. Mapped by United States Geological Survey (USGS) from surveys and U.S. Navy air photos, 1959–66. Named by Advisory Committee on Antarctic Names (US-ACAN) for Charles E. Nicholson, CE2, U.S. Navy, Construction Electrician at South Pole Station, 1974.

Rock formations of Marie Byrd Land